Psychrobacter piechaudii is a Gram-negative, non-spore-forming and on-motile bacterium from the genus of Psychrobacter.

References

External links
Type strain of Psychrobacter piechaudii at BacDive -  the Bacterial Diversity Metadatabase

Moraxellaceae
Bacteria described in 2017